Madawaska may refer to:

Places

Canada

New Brunswick
Madawaska County, New Brunswick
Madawaska Parish, New Brunswick
Madawaska (provincial electoral district), a former provincial electoral district (1874–1973)
Madawaska Centre, a former provincial electoral district (1973–1994)
Madawaska-la-Vallée, a former provincial electoral district (1994–2006)
Madawaska-les-Lacs, a former provincial electoral district (1973–2013)
Madawaska les Lacs-Edmundston, provincial electoral district (2013–)
Madawaska South, a former provincial electoral district (1973–1994)
Republic of Madawaska, a former unrecognized state in Madawaska County (1827)
Madawaska River (Saint John River), in Quebec and New Brunswick
The region around the Upper Saint John River (Bay of Fundy) in Maine and New Brunswick

Ontario
Madawaska River (Ontario)
Madawaska, Ontario
Madawaska Valley, Ontario
Camp Madawaska, a former Salvation Army camp in Nipissing District

United States
Madawaska, Maine, a town
Madawaska (CDP), Maine, a census-designated place within the above town

Other uses
 USS Madawaska

See also 
 Madawaska River (disambiguation)